A newel, also called a central pole or support column, is the central supporting pillar of a staircase.  It can also refer to an upright post that supports and/or terminates the handrail of a stair banister (the "newel post"). In stairs having straight flights it is the principal post at the foot of the staircase, but the term can also be used for the intermediate posts on landings and at the top of a staircase. Although its primary purpose is structural, newels have long been adorned with decorative trim and designed in different architectural styles.

Newel posts turned on a lathe are solid pieces that can be highly decorative, and they typically need to be fixed to a square newel base for installation.  These are sometimes called solid newels in distinction from hollow newels due to varying techniques of construction. Hollow newels are known more accurately as box newel posts. In historic homes, folklore holds that the house plans were placed in the newel upon completion of the house before the newel was capped.

The most common means of fixing a newel post to the floor is to use a newel post fastener, which secures a newel post to a timber joist through either concrete or wooden flooring.

In popular culture 
A loose ball cap finial on the newel post at the base of the stairway is a plot device in the 1946 classic It's a Wonderful Life. The same is used in jest in the 1989 film Christmas Vacation, in which Clark Griswold, in an emotional meltdown, cuts a loose finial off a newel post with a chainsaw.  He casually exclaims, "Fixed the newel post!" and carries on.

Gallery

References

External links

 

Stairways
Architectural elements
Stairs